NEBL Promotion Cup 1999 was the first test run tournament of the North European Basketball League. The tournament was held during the 1998-99 basketball season on 23 January – 5 April 1999. The tournament included 8 teams from Lithuania, Latvia, Estonia, Sweden and Finland.

BC Žalgiris won the tournament by defeating ASK/Brocēni/LMT in the final. BC Lietuvos rytas finished in third place by defeating Plannja Basket.

The Prize fund for the Final Four competitions equaled $100,000. The winner of the NEBL Promotion Cup was awarded with $45,000 cheque, the other finalist received $25,000, 3rd-place winner - $20,000 and 4th best team got $10,000.

NEBL Promotion Cup clubs

Group stage
During the group stage, each team played 10 games. A team faced opponents in own group twice (6 games) and each team from the other group once (4 games).

Group A

Group B

Source: Worldbasket.com

Final Four

Semifinal 1

Semifinal 2

Third-place game

Final

Final Standings

All-NEBL Team'99

Coaches of all teams, which participated in the 1999 NEBL Promotion Cup, selected All-NEBL Team'99:

References

External links
 NEBL
 NEBL
 Third place game
  "Zalgiris" Kaunas won NEBL Promotion Cup'99
  All-NEBL Team '99

1999
1998–99 in European basketball
1998–99 in Lithuanian basketball
1998–99 in Latvian basketball
1998–99 in Swedish basketball
1998–99 in Estonian basketball
1998–99 in Finnish basketball